Fissurella angusta is a species of sea snail, a marine gastropod mollusk in the family Fissurellidae, the keyhole limpets.

Description

Distribution
This species occurs in the Caribbean Sea, the Gulf of Mexico, off the Lesser Antilles and Hispaniola.

References

 Rosenberg, G.; Moretzsohn, F.; García, E. F. (2009). Gastropoda (Mollusca) of the Gulf of Mexico, Pp. 579–699 in: Felder, D.L. and D.K. Camp (eds.), Gulf of Mexico–Origins, Waters, and Biota. Texas A&M Press, College Station, Texas.

External links

Fissurellidae
Gastropods described in 1791
Taxa named by Johann Friedrich Gmelin